Jen DeNike is an American contemporary artist who works with video, photographer, installation and performance.

The Kunst-Werke Institute for Contemporary Art held an exhibition of her work in 2006. In 2010, her piece "Twirl" involved a marching band passing through the Brooklyn Museum. In January 2010, "Scrying", "a non-narrative performance ballet conceived and directed by New York-based artist Jen DeNike" received its world premiere at the Museum of Modern Art (MOMA). MOMA also has two of her photographs in its collection: Wrestling (2003) and Dunking (2004).

Exhibitions 

 “JEN”. Central Fine, January 9th-February 16th, 2022 
 Being Like Water, January 13 – March 10, 2018
 If She Hollers, November 14 – December 19, 2015
 The Star Card, November 10, 2012 – January 26, 2013
 The Scrying Trilogy, September 17 – October 23, 2010

References

External links
 Biography from the Anat Ebgi Art Gallery, Los Angeles
 Biography at smith-stewart.com
Anat Ebgi at Ocula

American artists
Living people
Bard College alumni
Year of birth missing (living people)